The 2000–01 OGC Nice season was the club's 97th season in existence and the fourth consecutive season in the top flight of French football. In addition to the domestic league, Nice participated in this season's edition of the Coupe de France and the Coupe de la Ligue. The season covers the period from 1 July 2000 to 30 June 2001.

Players

First-team squad

Transfers

In

Out

Pre-season and friendlies

Competitions

Overview

French Division 2

League table

Results summary

Results by round

Matches

Coupe de France

Coupe de la Ligue

References

External links

OGC Nice seasons
Nice